Cinema Popular is a Hong Kong-Chinese production company which develops, produces and distributes feature films.

Cinema Popular began in 2009 as an attempt to promote Chinese cinema by Hong Kong and mainland directors Peter Chan and Huang Jianxin respectively to create a new Chinese studio in response to the rapid box-office growth in the country.

External links
 Official Website

Film production companies of Hong Kong
Film production companies of China
Film distributors of China
Entertainment companies established in 2009
2009 establishments in China
2009 establishments in Hong Kong